The Ingrian language is a highly endangered language spoken in Ingria, Russia. Ingrian is a Uralic language of the Finnic branch, along with, among others, Finnish and Estonian. Ingrian is an agglutinative language and exhibits both vowel harmony and consonant gradation.

In the late 1930s, a written standard of the Ingrian language (referred to as kirjakeeli, "book language") was developed by the Ingrian linguist . Following the Soviet Union's 1937 politics regarding minority languages, the Ingrian written language has been forbidden and Ingrian remains unstandardised ever since. This article describes the grammar of kirjakeeli with references to (modern) dialectal nuances.

Morphological processes

Consonant gradation
Many words in Ingrian display consonant gradation, a grammatical process where the final consonant of a root may change in some inflected forms. Gradated words have two forms, called the strong grade and the weak grade. Follows a list of consonant gradations present in Ingrian, with examples:
{| class="wikitable"
|-
! Strong !! Weak !! Example !! Example !! Translation
|-
| k || ∅ || jalka || jalan || "foot, leg"
|-
| nk || ng || kenkä || kengän || "shoe"
|-
| t || ∅ || vahti || vahin || "guard"
|-
| lt || ll || ilta || illan || "evening"
|-
| rt || rr || merta || merran || "basket"
|-
| nt || nn || ranta || rannan || "shore"
|-
| st || ss || riista || riissan || "thing"
|-
| p || v || apu || avun || "help"
|-
| mp || mm || kumpa || kumman || "which"
|-
| pp || p || leppä || lepän || "alder"
|-
| uut, yytoot, ööt || uuvv, yyvvoovv, öövv|| suuto || suuvvon || "court"
|-
| Vut || Vvv || rauta || ravvan || "iron"
|-
| Vuk || Vvv || leuka || levvan || "jaw, chin"
|-
| Vit || Vij || maito || maijon || "milk"
|-
| Vik || Vj || poika || pojan || "boy, son"
|-
| eik, iik || eij, iij || reikä || reijän || "hole"
|}

Consonant gemination

In nominals and verbs alike, consonant gemination is an active process where a consonant following a light, uneven syllable, if followed by an (underlyingly) open syllable with a long vowel or a diphthong, is geminated. This process can be seen in the following examples:
 sana ("word") → kaks sannaa ("two words")
 käkö ("cuckoo") → kaks käkköä ("two cuckoos")
This gemination should not be confused with consonant gradation: Both can occur in one word. For instance, pittää ("to keep") has both consonant gradation and gemination:
 pittää ("to keep"); miä piän ("I keep"); höö  pitävät ("they keep")
Consonant gemination does not affect consonants that start an uneven syllable:
 literatura ("literature"); literaturaa ("into the literature")
Some (recent) loanwords aren't affected by gemination either:
 inženera ("engineer"); kaks inženeraa ("two engineers")
In the Soikkola dialect, there is a phonological distinction between primary geminates (those that were originally present in Proto-Finnic) and secondary geminates (those formed as a result of gemination). Primary geminates are realised as long, while secondary geminates are short. In the other dialects of Ingrian, both types of geminates are equally long.

Vowel elongation
In contrast with consonant gemination, nouns that do not have an even number of syllables and do not have a penultimate light syllable, experience vowel elongation in the inessive and adessive endings, where the final vowel becomes long:
 paikka ("area") → paikaas ("in the area"), koira ("dog") → koiraal ("on the dog")
 orava ("squirrel") → oravaal ("on the squirrel"), Soikkola ("Soikinsky Peninsula") → Soikkolaas ("on the Soikinsky Peninsula")
If the noun has consonant gradation, the weak grade determines the vowel length of the inflectional ending:
 poika ("boy") → pojal ("on the boy")
In some subdialects of the Soikkola dialect, this rule also holds true in the elative and ablative cases:
 orraava ("squirrel") → orraavaalt ("off the squirrel"); piakka ("area") → paigaast ("from the area")

Nouns
The Ingrian language does not distinguish gender in nouns, nor is there a definiteness distinction. Nouns can be declined for both case and number.

Cases
Ingrian nouns have thirteen noun cases. Unlike some plural pronouns, nouns don't have the accusative case and its function is taken over by either the genitive in the singular or the nominative in the plural.
{| class="wikitable"
|-
! Case !! Suffix !! English  !! Example !! Translation
|-
| nominative (nominativa) || -∅ || — || talo || a house
|-
| genitive (genitiva) || -n || of/'s || talon || a house's
|-
| partitive (partitiva) || -(t)a / -(t)ä || a bit of || talloa || a bit of a house
|-
| illative (illativa) || -V || into || talloo || into a house
|-
| inessive (inessiva) || -s || inside || talos || inside a house
|-
| elative (elativa) || -st || out of || talost || out of a house
|-
| allative (allativa) || -lle || onto || talolle || onto a house
|-
| adessive (adessiva) || -l || on top of || talol || on top of a house
|-
| ablative (ablativa) || -lt || out of || talolt || out of a house
|-
| translative (translativa) || -ks || into (being) || talos || into (being) a house
|-
| essive (essiiva) || -nna / -nnä || as || talonna || as a house
|-
| exessive (eksessiva) || -nt || out of (being) || talont || out of (being) a house
|-
| comitative (komitativa) || -nka / -nkä || with || talonka || with a house
|}
In the modern (spoken) language, the exessive case has grown to be obsolete. Furthermore, the comitative is only present in the Ala-Laukaa dialect of the Ingrian language, although it was adopted into the written language as well. Some of the endings differ in dialects. In the Soikkola dialect, for instance, the essive ending is -Vn rather than -nna, yielding talloon.

Nominative
The nominative case is used primarily to mark the subject of a verb:
 Kana kaakattaa ("The chicken cackles")
 Kana muni munan ("The chicken laid an egg")
Furthermore, it can be used as a form of address:
 Mama, miä tahon söövvä ("Mum, I want to eat")

Accusative
As mentioned above, the accusative isn't morphologically distinct from the genitive in the singular and the nominative in the plural. The accusative case is used to mark a direct object of a telic verb:
 Poika sööp lihan ("The boy will eat the meat")
 Tyttö näki koirat ("The girl saw the dogs")
The accusative is identical to the nominative when a direct object of an impersonal verb or a verb in the imperative mood:
 Söö liha! ("Eat the meat!")
 Söövvää liha ("The meat is eaten")

Partitive
The partitive is used in a number of functions. First of all, it is used to mark a direct object of an atelic verb:
 Poika sööp lihhaa ("The boy is eating the meat")
 Tyttö näki koiria ("The girl was seeing the dogs")
Secondly, the partitive case is used with numerals (other than yks, "one") and determiners to designate amounts of an object:
 Miul on kaks silmää ("I have two eyes")
 Miä näin paljo koiraa ("I saw a lot of dogs")
The partitive can be used to designate indefinite amounts:
 Miul on rahhaa ("I have money")
The partitive is used in comparative constructions to mark the object of comparison:
 Miä oon paremp häntä ("I am better than him")
Finally, the partitive is used as an indirect object of some postpositions:
 Tämä ono podarka miun lapsia vart. ("This is a present for my children")

Genitive
The genitive is used primarily to mark a possession by the inflected noun:
 Miä näin pojan koiran. ("I saw the boy's dog.")
 Lapsiin pere on suur. ("The children's family is big.")
Furthermore, it is used as an indirect object of many prepositions and postpositions:
 Talon al ei oo mittä. ("Under the house there isn't anything.")
 Möö elämmä talon sises. ("We live inside the house.")

Illative
The illative is primarily used to describe a direction into something:
 Miä mänin talloo. ("I went into the house.")
 Miä tokuin merree. ("I fell into the sea.")
It is also used to mark the designation of an object:
 Tämä poika tööhö ei kelpaa. ("This boy isn't fit for work.")
Furthermore, the illative is used to indicate a cause:
 Miun emä kooli lässyy. ("My mother died of a sickness.")
Finally, the illative is used to denote a timespan during which something didn't happen:
 En miä joont kahtee päivää. ("I haven't had a drink in two days.")

Inessive
The inessive is primarily used to describe a location inside something:
 Miä oon talos. ("I am inside the house.")
 Miä ujun meres. ("I am swimming in the sea.")
It is also used to describe a duration during which something has happened:
 Ei stroitettu Rim yhes päivääs. ("Rome wasn't built in one day.")

Elative
The elative is primarily used to describe a movement out of something:
 Miä tulin talost. ("I came out of the house.")
 Miä hyppäisin merest. ("I jumped out of the sea.")
It is furthermore used to describe the subject of some kind of information:
 Miä luen lehmilöist. ("I am reading about cows.")
 Miä kirjutan meijen maast. ("I am writing about our country.")
The elative is used to denote a domain to which an object belongs:
 Miä oon paremp kaikist lapsist. ("I am the best of all the children.")
 Kaikest miun perreest, miä suvvaan vaa miun emmää. ("Out of all my family, I only love my mother")
Finally, the elative is used to denote a material from which something is made:
 Miä teki pöksyt täst kankaast. ("I made trousers from this fabric.")
 Laps teki samoljotan paperist. ("The child made an airplane from paper.")

Allative
The allative is primarily used to describe motion onto something:
 Miä hyppäisin kannelle. ("I jumped onto the table.")
 Kolja pani koiran stoolille. ("Kolja put the dog on the chair.")
It is furthermore used in a dative function to mark an indirect object:
 Miä annoin hänelle omenan. ("I gave him an apple.")
 Mitä hää siulle saoi? ("What did he say to you?")

Adessive
The adessive is primarily used to describe a location on top of something:
 Miä issun kanneel. ("I am sitting on the table.")
 Koljan koira lessii stooliil. ("Kolja's dog is lying on the chair.")
It is also commonly used in a construction with the verb olla ("to be") to denote a possession:
 Miul ono kirja. ("I have a book.")
 Lapseel ovat pöksyt. ("The child has trousers.")
In the Soikkola dialect, the adessive is used instead of the comitative to denote an instrument of an action:
 Miä kirjutan krandoššiil. ("I am writing with a pencil.")
 Miä kuuntelen korviil. ("I am listening with [my] ears.")
Finally, the adessive is used to denote a location in time:
 Ööl suset jahtiivat. ("At night, the wolves hunt.")
 Kesäl ilma ono lämmää. ("In summer, the weather is warm.")

Ablative
The primary function of the ablative is to describe a motion off of something:
 Miä hyppäisin kanelt. ("I jumped off the table.")
 Kolja nosti koiran stolilt. ("Kolja picked the dog up from the table.")
It is furthermore used to mark a source of an action:
 Miä sain hänelt omenan. ("I got an apple from him.")
 Mitä hää siult kuuli? ("What did he hear from you?")

Translative
The primary function of the translative is to describe one's change of state towards being something:
 Miä tahon noissa siun ystäväks. ("I want to become your friend.")
 I konna muuttui käppiäks tytöks. ("And the frog turned into a beautiful lass.")
It is also used to denote that an action was or will be done by a specific point in time:
 Hää noisen sinnua unohtamaa voovven lopuks. ("He will forget you by the end of the year.")
 Pittää meille ostaa podarkoja hänen nimipäiväks. ("We need to buy birthday presents for her birthday.")
Finally, the translate is used in many fixed impressions:
 Miä läkkään ižoraks. ("I speak Ingrian")
 Tämä poika näyttiijää oikiin käppiäks. ("This boy is (lit. seems) very pretty.")

Essive
The primary function of the essive is to describe one's current state of being:
 Miun isä tekköö töötä kalastajanna. ("My father works as a fisherman.")
 Miun emä ompelianna jaksaa laatia siun pöksylöjä. ("As a tailor, my mother can fix your trousers.")
It is also used to denote the point of time when an action occurs:
 Pyhännä möö määmmä kirkkoo. ("On sunday we will go to church.")
 Nimipäivännä miä sain paljo podarkoja. ("On my birthday I received a lot of presents.")

Exessive
The exessive is a rare case, and is practically not used outside of the literary language. It's used only to describe a change of state out of being something:
 Miä tuli pois ompeliant. ("I stopped being a tailor.")

Stem types
A stem is the part of a word that can be changed by adding inflectional endings, and in most nominals corresponds to the nominative singular.

Vowel stems
Ingrian has several paradigms that involve a vowel that all endings are added onto. When pluralised, however, this vowel might change:

{| class="wikitable" style="text-align:center"
|-
! stemvowel !! English !!  !!  !!  !!  !!  !!  !!  !!  !! Notes
|-
| -a || chicken || kana || kanan || kannaa || kannaa || kanat || kannoin || kannoja || kannoi || Followed by nominals ending in -a when following a syllable with a, e or i and recent loanwords.
|-
| -a || dog || koira || koiran || koiraa || koiraa || koirat || koiriin || koiria || koirii || Followed by native nominals ending in -a when following a syllable with o or u.
|-
| -ä || summer || kesä || kesän || kessää || kessää || kesät || kessiin || kessiä || kessii
|-
| -a/-ä || parent || vanhemp(<*vanhempa) || vanhemman || vanhempaa || vanhempaa || vanhemmat || vanhempiin || vanhempia || vanhempii || Followed by nominals with historically an underlying final -a or -ä that underwent full vowel reduction.
|-
| -e || leaf || lehti(<*lešte) || lehen || lehtiä || lehtee || lehet || lehtilöin || lehtilöjä || lehtilöihe || Followed by nominals where (pre-)Proto-Finnic *-e regularly changed to -i.
|-
| -i || guard || vahti || vahin || vahtia || vahtii || vahit || vahtiloin || vahtioloja || vahtiloihe || Followed by relatively recent borrowings, from after the Proto-Finnic period, ending in -i.
|-
| -o/-ö,-u/-y || birch || koivu || koivun || koivua || koivuu || koivut || koivuin,koivuloin || koivuja,koivuloja || koivuihe,koivuloihe
|-
| -VV || earth || maa || maan || maata || maaha || maat || maijen || maita || maihe || Followed by nouns ending in long vowels and diphthongs. The illative takes on the final vowel, unless it's i, in which case the ending is -e.
|}

Consonant stems
Other nouns have their endings attached on a consonant base.

The largest group of these are nouns ending (underlyingly) in a -i, which resemble e-stems like lehti. The only difference between this paradigm and that of e-stems is the partitive singular, where the ending is added onto the consonant and is -ta (-tä), rather than -a (-ä).

The final consonant of these nouns must be either h, l, m, n, r, s or t:
{| class="wikitable" style="text-align:center"
|-
! English !!  !!  !!  !!  !!  !!  !!  !! 
|-
| tongue || keeli || keelen || keeltä || keelee || keelet || keeliin || keeliä || keelii 
|-
| big || suur(<*suuri) || suuren || suurta || suuree || suuret || suuriin || suuria || suurii
|}
Due to historical reasons, some nouns in this class have an irregular change of the stem:
{| class="wikitable" style="text-align:center"
|-
! English !!  !!  !!  !! Notes
|-
| knife || veitsi || veitsen || veistä || rowspan=2 | In a cluster -Cs, the partitive singular stem is -s.
|-
| child || laps || lapsen || lasta 
|-
| water || vesi || veen || vettä || rowspan=2 | Word-final *-ti regularly became -si.
|-
| five || viis || vijen || viittä
|-
| snow || lumi || lumen || lunta || m assimilates to the following t.
|-
| one || yks || yhen || yhtä || In the nominative singular and in the plural, *-kt became -ks, while in the singular and nominative plural it became -ht (~ -h)
|}
Some nouns historically ended on a consonant. In these nouns, the consonant before the final vowel is gradated:
{| class="wikitable" style="text-align:center"
|-
! English !!  !!  !! 
|-
| daughter || tytär(<*tüt'är) || tyttären || tytärtä
|}
A final subclass of such nouns are those ending in -ut (-yt). These exhibit an irregular illative ending and form the plural differently from e-stem nouns:
{| class="wikitable" style="text-align:center"
! English !!  !!  !!  !!  !!  !!  !!  !! 
|-
| Sun || päivyt || päivyen || päivyttä || päivyesse || päivyet || päivyein || päivyeitä || päivyeisse
|-
| beer || olut || olluen || olutta || olluesse || olluet || olluein || ollueita || ollueisse
|}

Another large group of nouns in Ingrian end in the consonant -s. These, again, come in various inflection types:

{| class="wikitable" style="text-align:center"
|-
! stemconsonant(s) !! English !!  !!  !!  !!  !!  !!  !!  !!  !! Notes
|-
| -nt- || third || kolmas || kolmannen || kolmatta || kolmantee || kolmannet || kolmansiin || kolmansia || kolmansii || Before -i, the stem consonants change to -ns-. In the partitive singular, the stem extends to -tt-.
|-
| -h- || man || mees || meehen || meestä || meehee || meehet || meehiin || meehiä || meehii
|-
| -∅- || column || patsas || patsaan || patsasta || patsaasse || patsaat || patsain || patsaita || patsaisse || In the Soikkola dialect, the stem consonant -h- is retained (for instance, the genitive singular is patsahan)
|-
| -ks- || treason || petos || petoksen || petosta || petoksee || petokset || petoksiin || petoksia || petoksii
|-
| -ks- || law || oikehus || oikehuen || oikehutta || oikehuee || oikehuet || oikehuksiin || oikehuksia || oikehuksii || The stem consonants only appears in the plural; In the singular, the stem-final -s is elided, while in the partitive, the stem extends to -tt-.
|}
A third group includes nouns ending in the consonant -n:
{| class="wikitable" style="text-align:center"
|-
! stemconsonant(s) !! English !!  !!  !!  !!  !!  !!  !!  !!  !! Notes
|-
| -s- || fly || kärpäin || kärpäisen || kärpäistä || kärpäisee || kärpäiset || kärpäisiin || kärpäisiä || kärpäisii || In some words, like ihmiin ("human"), the vowel preceding -n is shortened in inflected forms.
|}
Finally, some nouns ending in -e have an underlying stem consonant -∅-:
{| class="wikitable" style="text-align:center"
|-
! stemconsonant(s) !! English !!  !!  !!  !!  !!  !!  !!  !!  !! Notes
|-
| -∅- || boat || vene || venneen || venettä || venneesse || venneet || vennein || venneitä || veneissee || Compare this noun class to nouns like patsas ("column"). In this class, too, the Soikkola dialect retains the stem consonant -h- (for instance, the genitive singular is venneehen).
|}

Adjectives
Ingrian adjectives are inflected identically to nouns, and agree in number to the modified noun. In all cases but the comitative, the case of the adjectives also agree with the case of the noun. A noun in the comitative is modified by an adjective in the genitive:
{| class="wikitable" style="text-align:center"
|-
! Ingrian !! English
|-
| suur poika || "a big boy"
|-
| suuren pojan || "of the big boy"
|-
| kaks suurta poikaa || "two big boys"
|-
| suuren pojanka || "with the big boy"
|-
| suuret pojat || "big boys"
|}

Comparative
The comparative degree of Ingrian adjectives is generally formed by adding the suffix -mp to the adjective:
{| class="wikitable" style="text-align:center"
|-
! Positive degree !! English !! Comparative degree !! English
|-
| korkia || "high" || korkiamp || "higher"
|-
| noori (noore-) || "young" || nooremp || "younger"
|}
In some cases, a stem-final -a, -ä is transformed into an -e- in the comparative:
{| class="wikitable" style="text-align:center"
|-
! Positive degree !! English !! Comparative degree !! English
|-
| vanha || "old" || vanhemp || "older"
|-
| pitkä (pitä-) || "long" || pitemp || "longer"
|}
The comparative degree of the adjective inflects just like any other nominal:
{| class="wikitable" style="text-align:center"
|-
! Ingrian !! English
|-
| suuremp poika || "the bigger boy"
|-
| suuremman pojan || "of the bigger boy"
|}
Note that comparative endings have an underlying final vowel -a (or -ä in front-vocalic words).

Superlative
Unlike Finnish and Estonian, Ingrian doesn't have a superlative degree morphologically distinct from the comparative. Instead, a form of the indefinite pronoun kaik ("all") is used together with the comparative:
{| class="wikitable" style="text-align:center"
|-
! Ingrian !! English
|-
| kaikkia suuremp poika || "the biggest boy" (literally: "the boy bigger than all")
|-
| kaikkiin suuremp poika || "the biggest boy" (literally: "the boy biggest of all")
|-
| kaikkiis suuremp poika || "the biggest boy" (literally: "the boy biggest among all")
|}
Furthermore, the adverb samoi (borrowed from the Russian самый) can be used together with either the positive or comparative form of the adjective to express a superlative:
{| class="wikitable" style="text-align:center"
|-
! Ingrian !! English
|-
| samoi suur poika || "the biggest boy" (literally: "the most big boy")
|-
| samoi suuremp poika || "the biggest boy" (literally: "the most biggest boy")
|}

Pronouns
Ingrian pronouns are inflected similarly to their referent nouns. A major difference is the existence of the accusative (plural) in personal and some demonstrative pronouns, which is absent in all nouns and adjectives.

Personal pronouns
Unlike in Finnish, personal pronouns can be used to refer to both animate and inanimate nouns alike. Follows a table of personal pronouns:
{| class="wikitable"
! !! colspan=2 | 1st person !! colspan=2 | 2nd person !! colspan=2 | 3rd person
|-
! !! singular !! plural !! singular !! plural !! singular !! plural
|-
! Nominative
| miä("I") || möö("we") || siä("you") || töö("you") || hää("he, she, it") || höö("they")
|-
! Accusative
| miun || meijet || siun || teijet || hänen || heijet
|-
! Genitive
| miun || meijen || siun || teijen || hänen || heijen
|-
! Partitive
| minnua || meitä || sinnua || teitä || häntä || heitä
|-
! Illative
| miuhu || meihe || siuhu || teihe || hännee || heihe
|-
! Inessive
| mius || meis || sius || seis || hänes || heis
|-
! Essive
| miunna || meinnä || siunna || teinnä || hänennä || heinnä
|-
! Comitative
| miunka || meijenkä || siunka || teijenkä || hänenkä || heijenkä
|}
Other locative cases are formed using the appropriate nominal case endings to the inessive stem.

As seen above, Ingrian does not have grammatical gender, so the pronoun hää can be used for both male, female and inanimate referents alike. However, inanimate nouns are often referred to using the demonstrative pronoun se ("this") instead.

Some variation occurs among different dialects of Ingrian in regards to the personal pronouns. First of all, dialects with mid vowel raising exhibit the plural pronouns myy, tyy and hyy for möö, töö and höö respectively. Furthermore, in the Ala-Laukaa dialect, the third person singular pronoun hän is found instead of hää. Similar forms have been found also in the now-extinct Hevaha and Ylä-Laukaa dialects.

Since verbs in Ingrian conjugate according to grammatical person and number, subject personal pronouns may be omitted in Ingrian.

Demonstrative pronouns
Ingrian demonstratives can be used both as pronouns and as determiners in a determiner phrase. There are three sets of demonstratives: proximal (near to the speaker), distal (far from the speaker) and neutral, which is used to refer to an object without specifying its relative location is space, and is often used in anaphoras:
{| class="wikitable"
! !! colspan=2 | Proximal !! colspan=2 | Distal !! colspan=2 | Neutral
|-
! !! singular !! plural !! singular !! plural !! singular !! plural
|-
! Nominative
| tämä("this") || nämät("these") || too("that") || noo("those") || se("this, that") || neet("these, those")
|-
! Accusative
| tämän || nämät || toon || noo || sen || neet
|-
! Genitive
| tämän || näijen || toon || noijen || senen || niijen
|-
! Partitive
| tätä || näitä || toota || noota || sitä || niitä
|-
! Illative
| tähä || näihe || tooho || noohe || siihe || niihe
|-
! Inessive
| täs || näis || toos || noos || siin || niis
|-
! Elative
| täst || näist || toost || noost || siint || niist
|-
! Allative
| tälle || näille || toolle || noolle || sille || niille
|-
! Adessive
| täl || näil || tool || nool || sil || niil
|-
! Ablative
| tält || näilt || toolt || noolt || silt || niilt
|-
! Translative
| täks || näiks || tooks || nooks || siks || niiks
|-
! Essive
| tämännä || näinnä || toonna || noonna || senennä || niinnä
|}
The proximal demonstatives can be contracted to tää (< tämä), tään (< tämän) and näät (< nämät). Again, in dialects with mid vowel raising, the distal demonstratives are tuu and nuu rather than too and noo respectively. Furthermore, in the Ala-Laukaa and the extinct Hevaha dialects, as well as among some speakers of the Soikkola dialect, the plural neutral pronoun is ne rather than neet.

The genitive and accusative singular of the neutral demonstrative pronoun are often used interchangeably, counter to the prescriptive usage described in Junus (1936). Furthermore, for most speakers of the modern Soikkola dialect, the functions of the distal demonstrative have been taken over by the neutral pronoun (se/neet).

Interrogative pronouns
Ingrian interrogatives are divided into one that has an animate referent (ken, "who?") and one that has an inanimate referent (mikä, "what?"). Originally, the latter is a combination of the pronoun *mi- and the interrogative clitic -kä, but its inflected forms are still formed on the basis of the free pronoun:
{| class="wikitable"
! !! Animate !! Inanimate
|-
! Nominative 
| ken || mikä
|-
! Genitive
| kenen || minen
|-
! Partitive
| ketä || mitä
|-
! Illative
| kehe || mihe
|-
! Inessive
| kes || mis
|-
! Essive
| kenennä || minennä
|}
Other locative cases are formed using the appropriate nominal case endings to the inessive stem.

The interrogatives also have plural forms of the nominative, ket and mit respectively. Other case forms are used in the singular and plural alike. Like in Finnish and Estonian, but also English, the interrogatives are also used as relative pronouns:
 Mikä ono? ("What is it?")
 En tiije, mikä ono. ("I don't know, what it is.")

Verbs

Person and number
Ingrian verbs inflect for three persons, two numbers, and feature a separate impersonal form.
{| class="wikitable"
|-
! Number !! Person !! Suffix !! Example !! Translation
|-
| rowspan=3 | singular || first || -n || (miä) etsin || I search for
|-
| second || -t || (siä) etsit || you (sg.) search for
|-
| third || -V || (hää) etsii ||  he/she/it searches for
|-
| rowspan=3 | plural || first || -mma / -mmä || (möö) etsimmä || we search for
|-
| second || -tta / -ttä || (töö) etsittä || you (pl.) search for
|-
| third || -Vt-vat / -vät || (höö) etsiitetsivät ||  they search for
|-
| colspan=2 | impersonal || -taa / -tää || etsitää || one searches
|}
The impersonal form may always be used for the third person plural form.

Mood
Ingrian verbs inflect for four moods: indicative, conditional, imperative and potential. Of these, the potential is very rare.

The indicative mood is the only one to feature an past tense separate from the present tense and not formed by means of modal verbs.
{| class="wikitable"
|-
! Mood !! Suffix !! Example !! Translation
|-
| pres. indicative || -∅ || (hää) tahtoo || he/she/it wants
|-
| pst. indicative || -i || (hää) tahtoi || he/she/it wanted
|-
| conditional || -is || (hää) tahtois || he/she/it would have wanted
|-
| potential || -ne || (hää) tahtonoo ||  he/she/it may want
|}
The imperative paradigm is highly irregular compared to the other three moods, and occurs only in the second and third person, as well as the impersonal:
{| class="wikitable"
|-
! Number !! Person !! Suffix !! Example !! Translation
|-
| rowspan=2 | singular || second || -∅ || (siä) taho || want! (sg.)
|-
| third || -koo / -köö || (hää) tahtokoo ||  he/she/it must want
|-
| rowspan=2 | plural || second || -kaa / -kää || (töö) tahtokaa || want! (pl.)
|-
| third || -koot-kööt || (höö) tahtokoot ||  they must want
|-
| colspan=2 | impersonal || -ttakoo / -ttäköö || tahottakkoo || one must want
|}

References

Bibliography
  (in Ingrian)
 
  (in Russian)

Ingrian language
Finnic grammars